Brett Hodgson (born 12 February 1978) is an Australian rugby league coach and former professional player during the 1990s, 2000s and 2010s.

A New South Wales State of Origin representative goal-kicking , he played his club football in the NRL for the Western Suburbs Magpies, the Parramatta Eels and the Wests Tigers, with whom he won the 2005 NRL premiership. He played in the Super League for the Huddersfield Giants, with whom he won the 2009 Man of Steel Award, and the Warrington Wolves, with whom he won both the Challenge Cup and the Lance Todd Trophy. Hodgson also gained representative selection for the Exiles and City NSW.

Background
Hodgson was born in Liverpool, New South Wales, Australia.

Playing career

Western Suburbs Magpies
An Ingleburn RSL (Campbelltown) junior, Hodgson was graded to the Western Suburbs Magpies. He made his first-grade début under coach Tommy Raudonikis in round 11 of the 1997 ARL season, when Wests met the South Queensland Crushers at Campbelltown Stadium. He later said, "In my first game I was on the bench and didn’t get on until the 78th minute because Tommy forgot I was on the sidelines. Paul Langmack came off, grabbed the walkie-talkie and said: 'Tommy, you've got [Hodgson] down here, are you going to put him on?' Tommy asked me where I wanted to play and I said fullback. He said, 'Righto, off you go.'" After a further game on the bench, Hodgson moved to the wing for the remainder of the season. In his first game in the starting side, he scored 2 tries in a win against Sydney City.

In 1998, Hodgson played wing, halfback and fullback. He scored 10 tries from his 19 appearances, though the Magpies only won 4 of those games. In round 12 he scored his first hattrick, in a 36-24 win over the Adelaide Rams. Securing a spot at fullback in 1999, the last year before the Magpies merged, he played a further 19 games.

Hodgson later said of his departure from the club, "I got offered a deal to stay at Wests Tigers when they first merged. I had a conversation with Tommy that I was going to stay. I felt my loyalties lay with Tommy and I took less money to go to Parramatta. I had a lot of respect for Wayne Pearce [who was the first Wests Tigers coach] ... but I had a lot of loyalty to Tommy. The rest is history."

In 2008, Hodgson was the last remaining pre-2000 Western Suburbs Magpies' footballer playing in the NRL, before the return of John Skandalis in 2009, and Ray Cashmere in 2012.

Parramatta Eels
In 1999, Hodgson signed with Parramatta Eels for the 2000 NRL season. Hodgson's season was cut short following a high tackle from Cronulla's Mitch Healey, breaking his jaw.

The 2001 season was a successful one for Hodgson and Parramatta Eels. Hodgson was selected for City Origin and the club made it to the grand final. During his time at the Eels, Hodgson was the recipient of Gordon Tallis' famous slingshot tackle, whilst was representing NSW in the 2002 State of Origin series.
In 2003, Hodgson's final year at the Parramatta Eels was cut short in round 16 with a rib injury.

Wests Tigers
Hodgson returned to Campbelltown when he signed with the Wests Tigers in 2004. Taking over goal-kicking duties, a position he had sometimes filled in previous seasons, he scored 194 points for the year.

In round 24 of the 2005 season, Hodgson scored a club record 22 points during a 54-2 flogging of the Bulldogs. Three weeks later, he broke his own record, scoring 30 points against the Cowboys. He went on to play and kick five goals in the Tigers' 2005 NRL Grand Final victory over the North Queensland Cowboys. As NRL Premiers Wests faced Super League champions Bradford Bulls in the 2006 World Club Challenge.

On 23 July 2006, midway through the first half of the clash between Wests Tigers and his former club, Parramatta Eels, Hodgson sustained medial and cruciate ligament injuries and was sidelined for the remainder of the season. In Round 12 of 2007, Hodgson fractured his cheekbone in the match against the Parramatta Eels. After surgery to repair the fracture, Hodgson was sidelined for seven rounds and returned in Round 20 for his 200th first-grade game, a resounding win against the North Queensland Cowboys.

Salary cap restraints at the Wests Tigers forced Hodgson to look elsewhere for a contract for the 2009 season. Hodgson said his departure was, "through lack of opportunity in Australia. There was absolutely nothing here. If you've been in the game seven, eight, nine or 10 years I think there needs to be some sort of [salary cap] allowance."

Hodgson played his last game for the Wests Tigers on 7 September 2008 and although the club failed to make the top eight, they did send Hodgson out with a win against the Gold Coast Titans, 28–12. Hodgson was named Man of the Match. At the club's end of season awards, Hodgson was voted the Members' Player of the Year for 2008.

In 2015, Hodgson was named a Wests Tigers' life member.

Huddersfield Giants
Hodgson signed a two-year deal to play in the UK for Huddersfield Giants from 2009. In February, 2009, Hodgson was named team captain, replacing Chris Thorman.

Hodgson was awarded with the Super League's 'Man of Steel' Award after his first season with Huddersfield Giants, becoming only the fourth Australian to win the prestigious award since it was introduced in 1977. In April 2010 it was announced that Hodgson has signed for Super League rivals Warrington Wolves from 2011 on a two-year contract. His final day as an official Huddersfield Giants player was on 7 October 2010.

Warrington Wolves
Hodgson become the first choice  for Warrington Wolves in the 2011 season. Hodgson was selected for the Exiles squad for the inaugural Rugby League International Origin Match against England. He had a solid game and helped the Exiles win the first International Origin 16-12. He led the Warrington Wolves to the league leader's shield, but they fell at the quarter-final stage of the Challenge Cup (to Wigan) and semi-final stage of the Super League play-offs (to Leeds).
Due to an injury early in the 2012 season, and a rotation policy, he shared  duties with Stefan Ratchford, being used mainly for the more important games. Two days before Warrington Wolves beat Wigan Warriors 30-10 in the league, it was announced that ten Warrington Wolves players had signed contract extensions, including Hodgson for a further two years, taking him to the end of the 2014 season when he would be 36.

Hodgson was instrumental as he led Warrington Wolves to the 2012 Challenge Cup Final victory over the Leeds Rhinos at Wembley Stadium. The win was their 3rd in 4 years (Hodgson's first Challenge Cup winners medal) on 25 August, beating Leeds Rhinos 35-18 in the final, Hodgson scoring a try and kicking 5 goals as he also he became only the 4th Australian to win the Lance Todd Trophy man of the match award.

He played in the 2012 Super League Grand Final defeat by the Leeds Rhinos at Old Trafford.

Hodgson was selected as captain of the Exiles with former captain Danny Buderus moving back to Australia, new coach Daniel Anderson selected Hodgson as a  however an injury kept him out of Game 1 in which his side lost 18-10.

Highlights
First Grade Debut: 1997 – Round 11, Western Suburbs Magpies v South Queensland Crushers, Campbelltown Stadium, Sydney, 18 May.
Premierships: 2005 – Wests Tigers defeated North Queensland Cowboys 30 - 16 in the Grand Final, Stadium Australia, Sydney, 2 October.
Wests Tigers Club Captain: 2006-2008
NSW City Origin Debut: 2001 – NSW City Origin v NSW Country Origin, Carrington Park, Bathurst, New South Wales, 8 June.
NSW City Origin Selection: 2001-02, 2004–06, 2008
NSW City Origin Captain: 2008
New South Wales Debut: 2002 – State of Origin Game 1, New South Wales v Queensland, Stadium Australia, Sydney, 22 May.
New South Wales Selection: 2002, 2006
Exiles Debut: 2011 - International Origin Match, England RL vs Exiles RL, Headingley, Leeds, 10 June.
Exiles Selection: 2011, 2012

Coaching career
Hodgson left the Wolves at the end of the 2013 season to join both Hull F.C. and the Widnes Vikings as a coaching consultant for the season ahead. Hodgson also served as the kicking consultant for Sale Sharks Rugby Union Club. He was assistant coach at Widnes Vikings, as well as the head coach of the Widnes Vikings Academy Team.

Hodgson returned to Wests Tigers for the 2018 season as an assistant coach and head coach for the feeder team, the Western Suburbs Magpies. He said, "It's great to be back. I'm still living out at Campbelltown which is where I grew up. I've always wanted to be a coach. When you get to your late 20s and it's potentially coming to an end, you look to that next stage in your life. I'm really enjoying it so far."

On 25 November 2020, Hodgson was named as the new head coach of Hull F.C.  Hodgson's reign at Hull F.C. got off to a good start as the club only lost once in their opening seven matches.  However, the club ended the season winning only one game (against Hull Kingston Rovers) from the last nine fixtures to finish 8th on the table.
In September 2022, Hodgson stepped down as head coach of Hull F.C. by mutual consent.  The club finished ninth on the table and missed the playoffs for a second consecutive season.

In March 2023, Hodgson joined Eddie Jones' Wallabies coaching team as Defensive Coach. This came after Hodgson had previously been hired by Jones in the same role with England's national rugby union team until Jones was sacked in late 2022.

Personal life
Hodgson and his wife Skye have two children; a daughter, Annaliese and a son, Christian.

References

Sources

External links
Profile at nrl.com
Huddersfield Giants profile

1978 births
Living people
Australian rugby league coaches
Australian rugby league players
Australian expatriate sportspeople in England
Exiles rugby league team captains
Exiles rugby league team players
Huddersfield Giants captains
Huddersfield Giants players
Hull F.C. coaches
Lance Todd Trophy winners
New South Wales City Origin rugby league team players
New South Wales Rugby League State of Origin players
Parramatta Eels players
Rugby league fullbacks
Rugby league players from Sydney
Sportsmen from New South Wales
Warrington Wolves captains
Warrington Wolves players
Western Suburbs Magpies players
Wests Tigers players